Hypomyrina is an Afrotropical genus of butterflies in the family Lycaenidae. The genus was erected by Hamilton Herbert Druce in 1891.

Species
Hypomyrina fournierae Gabriel, 1939
Hypomyrina mimetica Libert, 2004
Hypomyrina nomenia (Hewitson, 1874)
Hypomyrina nomion (Staudinger, 1891)

References

Deudorigini
Lycaenidae genera
Taxa named by Hamilton Herbert Druce